Dawn of a New Day may refer to:

 Dawn of a New Day (Crystal Shawanda album)
 Dawn of a New Day (O'Donel Levy album)